Primula is a genus of herbaceous flowering plants in the family Primulaceae. They include the primrose (P. vulgaris), a familiar wildflower of banks and verges. Other common species are P. auricula (auricula), P. veris (cowslip), and P. elatior (oxlip). These species and many others are valued for their ornamental flowers. They have been extensively cultivated and hybridised (in the case of the primrose, for many hundreds of years). Primula are native to the temperate Northern Hemisphere, south into tropical mountains in Ethiopia, Indonesia, and New Guinea, and in temperate southern South America. Almost half of the known species are from the Himalayas.

Primula has over 500 species in traditional treatments, and more if certain related genera are included within its circumscription.

Description

Primula is a complex and varied genus, with a range of habitats from alpine slopes to boggy meadows. Plants bloom mostly during the spring, with flowers often appearing in spherical umbels on stout stems arising from basal rosettes of leaves; their flowers can be purple, yellow, red, pink, blue, or white. Some species show a white mealy bloom (farina) on various parts of the plant. Many species are adapted to alpine climates.

Taxonomy

Primula was known at least as early as the mediaeval herbalists, although first formally described as a genus by Linnaeus in 1753, and later in 1754 in his Flora Anglica. Linnaeus described seven species of Primula. One of its earliest scientific treatments was that of Charles Darwin study of heterostyly in 1877 (The different forms of flowers on plants of the same species). Since then, heterostyly (and homostyly) have remained important considerations in the taxonomic classification of Primula. Primula is a member of the Primulaceae family. The most complete treatment of the family, with nearly 1000 species arranged into 22 genera, was by Pax and Knuth in 1905.

Phylogeny

Primula is the largest genus in the family Primulaceae, within which it is placed in the subfamily Primuloideae, being the nominative genus.

The position of Primula within the family and its relationship to other genera is shown in this cladogram:

Classification

The genus Dodecatheon originated from within Primula, its species are now included in Primula.

Sections of genus Primula

The classification of the genus Primula has been investigated by botanists for over a century. As the genus is both large and diverse (with about 430–500 species), botanists have organized the species in various sub-generic groups. The most common is division into a series of thirty sections. Some of these sections (e.g. Vernales, Auricula) contain many species; others contain only one.
 
Amethystina
Auricula
Bullatae
Candelabra
Capitatae
Carolinella
Cortusoides
Cuneifolia
Denticulata
Dryadifolia
Farinosae
Floribundae
Grandis
Malacoidea
Malvacea
Minutissimae
Muscaroides
Nivales
Obconica
Parryi
Petiolares
Pinnatae
Pycnoloba
Reinii
Rotundifolia
Sikkimensis
Sinenses
Soldanelloideae
Souliei
Vernales

Selected species

Species include:

Primula alcalina (bluedome primrose)
Primula algida
Primula aliciae 
Primula allionii (Allioni's primrose)
Primula alpicola (moonlight primrose)
Primula amethystina
Primula angustifolia (alpine primrose)
Primula anisodora (anise primrose)
Primula anvilensis (boreal primrose)
Primula appenina
Primula arunachalensis
Primula atrodentata
Primula aurantiaca (primevère à fleurs oranges)
Primula aureata
Primula auricula (auricula, bear's ear)
Primula auriculata
Primula bathangensis
Primula beesiana (candelabra primrose)
Primula bella
Primula bellidifolia
Primula bergenioides
Primula bhutanica
Primula blattariformis
Primula boothii
Primula borealis (northern primrose)
Primula bracteosa
Primula bulleyana (candelabra primrose)

Primula calderiana
Primula calliantha
Primula calyptrata
Primula capillaris (Ruby Mountain primrose)
Primula capitata
Primula capitata ssp. mooreana
Primula capitata ssp. crispata
Primula capitellata
Primula carniolica (Carniolan primrose)
Primula caveana
Primula cawdoriana
Primula cernua
Primula chionantha
Primula chumbiensis
Primula chungensis
Primula chasmophila
Primula clarkei
Primula clusiana
Primula clutterbuckii
Primula cockburniana
Primula concholoba
Primula concinna
Primula conspersa
Primula cortusoides
Primula cuneifolia (wedgeleaf primrose, pixie-eye primrose)
Primula cusickiana (Cusick's primrose)
Primula daonensis
Primula darialica
Primula davidii
Primula deflexa
Primula denticulata (drumstick primrose, Himalayan primrose)
Primula deorum (Rila primrose, Rila cowslip, God's cowslip)
Primula deuteronana
Primula dryadifolia
Primula edgeworthii
Primula egaliksensis (Greenland primrose)
Primula elatior (oxlip, true oxlip, oxslip)
Primula elizabethiae
Primula elongata
Primula erythrocarpa
Primula farinosa (birdseye primrose)
Primula farreriana
Primula fedschenkoi
Primula fenghwaiana
Primula filchnerae
Primula filipes
Primula firmipes
Primula fistulosa
Primula flaccida
Primula floribunda
Primula florindae (Himalayan cowslip, Tibetan cowslip)
Primula forrestii
Primula frondosa

Primula gambeliana
Primula gemmifera
Primula geraniifolia
Primula giraldiana
Primula glabra
Primula glaucescens
Primula glomerata
Primula glutinosa
Primula gracilenta
Primula gracillipes
Primula griffithii
Primula halleri (long-flowered primrose, Haller's primrose)
Primula helodoxa
Primula hendersonii (broad-leaved shootingstar, Henderson's shootingstar, mosquito-bill, sailor caps)
Primula heucherifolia
Primula hirsuta (stinking primrose)
Primula hookeri
Primula incana (silvery primrose, mealy primrose)
Primula interjacens
Primula involucrata
Primula ioessa
Primula irregularis
Primula japonica (Japanese primrose, Japanese cowslip)
Primula jesoana
Primula jigmediana
Primula juliae (Julia's primrose, purple primrose)
Primula kingii
Primula kisoana
Primula kitaibeliana (Kitaibel's primrose)
Primula klattii
Primula laurentiana (birdseye primrose)
Primula lihengiana

Primula listeri
Primula longiscapa
Primula lutea
Primula luteola
Primula macrophylla (largeleaf primrose)
Primula magellanica
Primula malacoides (fairy primrose, baby primrose)
Primula malvacea
Primula marginata (marginate primrose)
Primula megaseifolia
Primula melanantha
Primula melanops
Primula minima (dwarf primrose)
Primula minor
Primula mistassinica (Mistassini primrose)
Primula modesta
Primula mollis
Primula moupinensis

Primula munroi
Primula muscarioides
Primula nipponica
Primula nivalis (snowy primrose)
Primula obconica (poison primrose, German primrose)
Primula orbicularis

Primula palinuri
Primula parryi (Parry's primrose)
Primula pedemontana
Primula petelotii
Primula petiolaris
Primula pinnatifida
Primula poissonii
Primula polyneura
Primula prenantha
Primula prolifera (glory-of-the-marsh)
Primula pulchella
Primula pulverulenta (mealy cowslip)
Primula pumila (arctic primrose)
Primula reidii
Primula reinii
Primula renifolia
Primula reptans
Primula reticulata
Primula rockii
Primula rosea (Himalayan meadow primrose)
Primula rotundifolia
Primula rusbyi (Rusby's primrose)
Primula sapphirina
Primula saxatilis (rock primrose)
Primula scandinavica (Scandinavian primrose)
Primula scapigera
Primula scotica (Scottish primrose)
Primula secundiflora
Primula septemloba
Primula serratifolia
Primula sheriffii
Primula sieboldii (Japanese primrose)
Primula sikkimensis (Sikkim cowslip)
Primula sinensis (syn. P. praenitens)
Primula sinolisteri
Primula sinomollis
Primula soldanelloides
Primula sonchifolia
Primula souliei
Primula spectabilis
Primula specuicola (alcove primrose, cave-dwelling primrose)
Primula stricta (coastal primrose, strict primrose)
Primula strumosa
Primula suffrutescens (Sierra primrose)
Primula szechuanica
Primula takedana
Primula tanneri
Primula tardiflora
Primula tenella
Primula tenuiloba
Primula tenuituba
Primula tibetica
Primula tschuktschorum (Chukchi primrose)
Primula tyrolensis
Primula vaginata
Primula valentiniana
Primula veris (cowslip)
Primula verticillata (yellow primrose)
Primula vialii (wayside primrose, pagoda primrose, orchid primrose, poker primrose)
Primula villosa
Primula vulgaris (primrose)
Primula waltonii
Primula watsonii
Primula warshenewskiana
Primula whitei
Primula wilsonii
Primula wollastonii (Wollaston's primrose)
Primula wulfeniana (Wulfen's primrose)
Primula xanthopa
Primula yunnanensis
Primula yuparensis

Etymology

The word primula is the Latin feminine diminutive of primus, meaning first (prime), applied to flowers that are among the first to open in spring.

Ecology

Primulas are used as a food plant by the Duke of Burgundy butterfly.

Distribution and habitat

Although there are over 400 species of Primula, about 75% are found in the eastern Himalayan mountain chain and western China (Yunnan Province), constituting a centre of diversity. Other centres of diversity are a western Asian centre (Caucasus, European mountain ranges from the Pyrenees, through the Alps to the Carpathian Mountains), mountains of East Asia and those of western North America. Primula is found in mountainous or higher latitude zones of North America, Europe, and Asia, with extension into South America, Africa (mountains of Ethiopia) and tropical Asia (islands of Java and Sumatra). About 25 species occur in North America (represented in five sections).

Primula is found in the humid and moderate climate regions of the Northern Hemisphere, predominantly in the forest belt, plain meadows, Alpine lawns, and nival and meadow tundras.

Garden hybrids and cultivars

Primula species have been extensively cultivated and hybridised, mainly derived from P. elatior, P. juliae, P. veris and P. vulgaris. Polyanthus (Primula × polyantha) is one such group of plants, which has produced a large variety of strains in all colours, usually grown as annuals or biennials and available as seeds or young plants.

Another huge range of cultivars, known as auriculas, are derived from crosses between P. auricula and P. hirsuta (among others). Specialist nurseries and auricula societies support the growing and showing of these choice strains.

AGM cultivars

The following hybrid varieties and cultivars have gained the Royal Horticultural Society's Award of Garden Merit:- 

'Broadwell Milkmaid' (auri) 
Charisma series (prim) 
'Clarence Elliott' (auri) 
Crescendo Series (poly)
'Crescendo Blue Shades' 
'Crescendo Bright Red' 

'Crescendo Pink and Rose Shades' 
Danova Series (prim) 

'Danova Rose' 
'Francisca' (poly) 
'Guinevere' (poly) 
Primula × loiseleurii 'Aire Mist' (auri) 
Primula × pubescens (auri) 

'Tony' (auri) 
'Wanda' (prim)

Hybrids

Primula × kewensis]=P. floribunda × P. verticillata (Kew primrose)
Primula × polyantha=P. veris × P. vulgaris (false oxlip, polyanthus primula)
Primula × pubescens=P. hirsuta × P. auricula

References

Bibliography

, see also Species Plantarum

Species

, in Flora of China online vol. 15

External links

Armeniapedia: Medicinal Uses of Primula

 
Garden plants
Primulaceae genera
Taxa named by Carl Linnaeus